Nyabing is a small town in the Great Southern region of Western Australia. The name is of Aboriginal origin and is thought to derive from the Aboriginal word "ne-yameng", which is the name of an everlasting flower Rhodanthe manglesii.

The first Europeans to visit the area were sandalwood cutters, and the first lease taken in the area was by settler John Hassell in 1873.

The townsite was planned in 1911 as part of the Great Southern Railway; the name given to the siding was Nampup. The name Nampup is also Aboriginal in origin and is the name of a local soak. Lots were surveyed later in the year and the town was gazetted in 1912.
The name was changed later that year after several complaints that Nampup was too similar to Nannup; the town was renamed to Nyabing.

The surrounding areas produce wheat and other cereal crops. The town is a receival site for Cooperative Bulk Handling.

References 

Towns in Western Australia
Great Southern (Western Australia)
Grain receival points of Western Australia